Emad El Nahhas (born 15 February 1976) is an Egyptian football coach and former player who is the manager of the Al Ittihad Alexandria. El-Nahhas finished his career at Al-Ahly Club after retiring, undertaking training several times.

Playing career

Aswan SC
El Nahhas started his career at the Maghagha Youth Center, and there are Zamil players like Ahmed Hassan. He moved to Aswan Club in 1996 at the age of 21, after it was tested by coach Mohamed Amer, the team's coach.

Ismaily SC
After performing well for two seasons with Aswan, Al-Ismaily Club contracted El Nahhas in 1998 despite the interest of other clubs such as Al-Ahly, Zamalek and Al-Masry. It was German coach Frank Engel who approved his transfer to Ismaili.

El Nahhas crowned Al-Ismaili with the Egyptian League title in the 2001–2002 season, and in that season he scored 5 goals. The people of the league win the team to participate in the 2003 African Champions League, in which Ismaily reached the final. El Nahhas bore the team's captaincy in the first leg of the final against Nigerian club Enyimba, a game that ended in Ismaili's 2–0 defeat. The team did not succeed in compensating in Ismailia, as it only won 1-0 and won the runners-up.

Al-Nassr FC
After spending  seasons with Al-Ismaily, Al-Nahhas moved to the Saudi Al-Nasr Club in 2004 on loan for 6 months. El Nahhas contract with Al-Ismaily ended in the summer of 2004, after returning from loaning victory.

Al-Ahly
In June 2004 Al-Ahly announced the inclusion of Nahhas for three seasons, compared to 400,000 pounds in the season. Al-Ahly's transition to Al-Ahly angered some Ismaili fans, who considered his lending of the Saudi victory to Al-Ahly as a stop. But El Nahhas denied that his contract to join Al-Ahly had passed before he loaned victory.

The joining of Al-Nahhas during the rebuilding of Al-Ahly team led by the Portuguese coach, Manuel Jose, came after a bad period between 2000 and 2004. The most prominent faces that joined Al-Ahly at that time were Mohamed Abu Trika, Mohamed Barakat and Islam Al-Shater, as well as El Nahhas. And those new deals achieved many championships for Al-Ahly.

Despite Imad El Nahhas's skill but he plays as a defender, he scored 8 goals for the Al-Ahly club in the 2005–2006 season, three of them in the Al-Ahly match with Al-Ittihad FC, which ended 6-0 for Al-Ahly, also scored a skill goal in the Guineas club Renacimento in the League The 2006 African Champions that ended with Al-Ahly's victory 4–0, and scored again in the Egypt Cup a goal against Zamalek in the match that ended 3–0 in favor of Al-Ahly.

He also scored the decisive goal in the penalty shoot-out that awarded Al-Ahly the African Super Cup against the Tunisian coastal star.

Imad El Nahhas is well known for his morals and trustworthiness inside the stadium.

Coaching career

Al-Ahly
El-Nahhas went to administrative work after retiring, assuming the position of assistant director of the football club in Al-Ahly Club for the 2009–2010 season, after which he worked as vice president of the junior sector in the club until he resigned in May 2014.

Al-Merrikh SC
He took over the sporting director job of the Al-Merrikh SC in 2010, then left the position after one year.

Aswan SC
Then he went after training, and he took the position of coach for the first time in July 2014 when he became manager The technical club of Aswan Club, which competes in the Egyptian League, second division. In his first season with Aswan, the 2014–15 season, Al-Nahhas led the team to return to the Premier League after an 11-year absence. He then managed to keep Aswan in the Premier League after the team finished fifteenth in the end of the 2015–16 season, 10 points behind the closest relegation teams. With the start of the following season, the team suffered negative results that made it score only 5 points after 9 rounds passed, occupying the sixteenth place. This prompted Copper to resign in November 2016.

El Sharkia SC
He took over the training of the El Sharkia SC on February 8, 2017, stayed for 17 games, bad results led to his leave on July 31, 2018.

El Raja SC
He trained Al-Rajaa on September 28, 2017, after Khaled Al-Qashmakh's resignation after the team received its third consecutive defeat. Then, the Board of Directors dismissed him on December 24, 2017, for poor results and the team finished last in the league standings.

Tanta SC
He took over the training of the Tanta SC on March 1, 2018, stayed for 7 games, bad start led to his quick leave on April 27, 2018.

Al Mokawloon Al Arab SC
He took over the training of the Arab Contractors Club on October 24, 2018, to succeed resigner Alaa Nabil.

Managerial statistics

Honours

As a player
Ismaily:
 Egyptian Premier League: 2001–02
 Egyptian Super Cup: 2000

Al Ahly:
 Egyptian Premier League: 2004–05, 2005–06, 2006–07, 2007–08, 2008–09
 the third place: FIFA Club World Cup 2006
 CAF Champions League: 2005, 2006, 2008
 African Super Cup: 2006, 2007, 2009
 Egyptian Soccer Cup: 2006, 2007
 Egyptian Super Cup: 2005, 2006, 2007, 2008

As a manager
Aswan SC:
Egyptian Second Division: 2015–16 Egyptian Second Division (Promoted)

References

External links 
 
 El-Nahhas's goal against Renacimiento in African Champions League 2006
 El-Nahhas's goal against Al-Ittihad Al-Iskandary in Egyptian League 2005–2006
 Emad El Nahhas at Footballdatabase

1976 births
Living people
Egyptian footballers
Egyptian expatriate footballers
Egypt international footballers
Al Ahly SC players
Association football sweepers
Ismaily SC players
Expatriate footballers in Saudi Arabia
2004 African Cup of Nations players
People from Minya Governorate
Al Nassr FC players
Egyptian Premier League players
Saudi Professional League players